Parachlamydia, is a genus of bacteriae belonging to the Chlamydiota. Species include P. acanthamoeba.

See also
 List of bacterial orders
 List of bacteria genera

References

Chlamydiota
Bacteria genera